The 24th Critics' Choice Awards were presented on January 13, 2019, at the Barker Hangar at the Santa Monica Airport, honoring the finest achievements of filmmaking and television programming in 2018. The ceremony was broadcast on The CW and hosted by Taye Diggs. The nominations were announced on December 10, 2018. HBO and Netflix co-led with 20 nominations, followed by FX with 16.

Winners and nominees

Film

#SeeHer Award
Claire Foy

Television

The Critics' Choice Creative Achievement Award
Chuck Lorre

Films with multiple nominations and wins

The following twenty-eight films received multiple nominations:

The following seven films received multiple awards:

Television programs with multiple nominations and wins

The following programs received multiple nominations:

The following programs received multiple awards:

References

External links
24th Annual Critics’ Choice Awards – Winners

Broadcast Film Critics Association Awards
2018 film awards